Garry Kent Marshall (November 13, 1934 – July 19, 2016) was an American filmmaker and actor. Marshall began his career in the 1960s as a writer for The Lucy Show and The Dick Van Dyke Show until he developed the television adaptation of Neil Simon's play The Odd Couple in 1970. He rose to fame in the 1970s for creating the ABC sitcom Happy Days. He later went on to direct the films The Flamingo Kid, Overboard, Beaches, Pretty Woman, Runaway Bride, and The Princess Diaries, as well as the romantic comedy ensemble films Valentine's Day, New Year's Eve, and Mother's Day.

Early life
Garry Kent Marshall was born in the Bronx, New York City, on November 13, 1934, the only son and the eldest child of Anthony "Tony" Masciarelli (later Anthony Wallace Marshall; 1906–1999), a director of industrial films and producer, and Marjorie Irene (née Ward; 1908–1983), the owner and teacher in a tap dance school. He was the brother of actress-director Penny Marshall and Ronny Marshall Hallin, a television producer. His father was of Italian descent, his family having come from San Martino sulla Marrucina, Chieti, Abruzzo, and his mother was of German, English, and Scottish ancestry. His father changed his last name from Masciarelli to Marshall before his son Garry was born. Garry Marshall was baptized Presbyterian and also raised Lutheran for a time.

He attended De Witt Clinton High School and Northwestern University, where he wrote a sports column for The Daily Northwestern, and was a member of the Alpha Tau Omega fraternity. Beginning in 1956, Marshall served a stint in the U.S. Army as a writer for Stars and Stripes and Seoul News, and was production chief for Armed Forces Radio Network; serving in Korea.

Career

Marshall began his career as a joke writer for such comedians as Joey Bishop and Phil Foster and became a writer for The Tonight Show with Jack Paar.  He originally partnered with writer Fred Freeman.

In 1961, he and Freeman moved to Hollywood, where they broke into writing sitcoms on The Joey Bishop Show. Freeman, however, found that he did not enjoy sitcom work, and moved back to New York.  Marshall teamed up with writing partner Jerry Belson, and the two worked together through the 1960s. The pair worked on The Dick Van Dyke Show, The Joey Bishop Show, The Danny Thomas Show, and The Lucy Show. Their first television series as creator-producers was Hey, Landlord, which lasted one season (1966–67). Then they adapted Neil Simon's play The Odd Couple for television. Moving into the 1970s, Marshall worked on his own or with others, and created Happy Days, Laverne & Shirley (starring his sister Penny, who had earlier had a recurring role on The Odd Couple), and Mork & Mindy, which were produced by his associates Thomas L. Miller, Robert L. Boyett, and Edward K. Milkis. He was also a co-creator of Makin' It, which the three men also produced.

In the early 1980s, he met Héctor Elizondo while playing basketball, and they became great friends. Elizondo appeared in every film that Marshall directed, beginning with his first feature film Young Doctors in Love. Elizondo once noted that he is written into all of Marshall's contracts whether he wanted to do the film or not. In the opening credits of Exit to Eden, their eighth film together, Elizondo is credited "As Usual ... Hector Elizondo". In 1984, Marshall had a film hit as the writer and director of The Flamingo Kid. Of all Marshall's films, Elizondo had his biggest role in The Flamingo Kid as main character Matt Dillon's father. 

Marshall had several responsibilities during this period of his career: most of his hit television series were created and executive produced by him. His first producing assignment came with Hey, Landlord in 1966. He stepped up the next year, producing The Lucy Show. Then came successes in producing The Odd Couple, Laverne & Shirley, Blansky's Beauties, Mork & Mindy, Angie, and Happy Days.

One such project titled Four Stars was directed by Lynda Goodfriend (who portrayed Lori Beth in Happy Days), and was based on a play Goodfriend had read when she was studying at the Lee Strasberg Center, which had been written by John Schulte and Kevin Mahoney. It starred Julie Paris (the daughter of Jerry Paris) and Bert Kramer. Schulte later co-wrote with TV veteran writer and producer Fred Fox Jr., who penned and produced a number of Marshall's television series, including Happy Days and Laverne & Shirley. Marshall went on to focus on directing feature films, with a series of hits, such as Beaches, Pretty Woman, The Princess Diaries, Valentine's Day, and New Year's Eve.

Marshall was also an actor, appearing in Murphy Brown and in such films as Soapdish, On the Lot, his sister's A League Of Their Own and Albert Brooks' Lost in America, and provided a guest-starring voice for The Simpsons episodes "Eight Misbehavin' and "Homer the Father" (one of his first roles as an undercover cop in the counter-culture drama Psych-Out starring Jack Nicholson). He appeared in two episodes of Happy Days as a drummer. He was a drummer in the second last scene of The Princess Diaries 2: Royal Engagement and he plays a drummer in his film Overboard.

His theater credits included Wrong Turn at Lungfish, which he wrote in collaboration with Lowell Ganz, The Roast with Jerry Belson, Shelves and Happy Days: A New Musical with Paul Williams, which had its premiere at the Falcon Theater in Burbank, California, February 24, 2006. He portrayed the role of "director" on Burbank's "Lights... camera... action!" float in the 2014 Rose Parade. In 2014, Marshall appeared in a guest star role in a February episode in season 11 of Two and a Half Men.

Personal life
Marshall married Barbara Sue Wells on March 9, 1963. They had three children, including Scott Marshall. His daughters are Lori Marshall (who he co-wrote a book with) and Kathleen Marshall (who appeared in all of his films).

Death and tributes
On the morning of July 19, 2016, Marshall, aged 81, died at a hospital in Burbank, California, due to complications of pneumonia after suffering a stroke.

Henry Winkler paid tribute to Marshall on Barry in 2019 and SAG-AFTRA made a Memoriam Tribute to Marshall on the SAG Awards in 2019. Also, Julia Roberts paid tribute to Marshall in Pretty Woman: The Musical, in 2018.

ABC aired the special The Happy Days of Garry Marshall on May 12, 2020.

Filmography

Film

Television

Video games

Awards and nominations
In 1996, Marshall was awarded the Women in Film Lucy Award in recognition of excellence and innovation in creative works that have enhanced the perception of women through the medium of television. He was inducted into the Television Hall of Fame for his contributions to the field of television in 1997.

In 2012, he was inducted into the National Association of Broadcasters' Broadcasting Hall of Fame.

Marshall received the Valentine Davies Award (1995) and Laurel Award for TV Writing Achievement (2014) from the Writers Guild of America.

References

Further reading

External links

 
 
 
 

1934 births
2016 deaths
20th-century American male actors
20th-century American male writers
20th-century American writers
21st-century American male actors
21st-century American male writers
21st-century American writers
American people of Italian descent
American male film actors
American male screenwriters
American male television actors
American male television writers
American male voice actors
American people of English descent
American people of German descent
American writers of Italian descent
American people of Scottish descent
American television directors
American television writers
Burials at Forest Lawn Memorial Park (Hollywood Hills)
Comedy film directors
Deaths from pneumonia in California
Film directors from New York (state)
Film producers from New York (state)
Male actors from New York City
Northwestern University alumni
People of Abruzzese descent
Screenwriters from New York (state)
Showrunners
Writers from the Bronx